Provincial Road 422 (PR 422) is a provincial road in the Canadian province of Manitoba. It runs from Highway 23 to Provincial Road 205.

422